Sergei Pankov may refer to:
 Sergei Pankov (footballer) (born 1978), Russian football player
 Sergey Pankov (swimmer) (born 1988), Uzbekistani swimmer